The 1901 Boston Americans season was the first season for the professional baseball franchise that later became known as the Boston Red Sox, and the first season of play for the American League (AL). It resulted in the Americans finishing second in the AL with a record of 79 wins and 57 losses, four games behind the Chicago White Stockings. The team was managed by Jimmy Collins and played its home games at Huntington Avenue Grounds.

Regular season 
Prior to the regular season, the team held spring training in Charlottesville, Virginia.
 April 26: The franchise's first-ever American League contest ends as a 10–6 loss to the Baltimore Orioles at Oriole Park in Baltimore. Boston's first run was scored by player-manager Jimmy Collins in the fifth inning. In 1903, the Orioles relocated to New York City as the Highlanders, then in 1913 became known as the New York Yankees.
 April 30: After losing their first three games, the team records its first win, an 8–6 victory in 10 innings over the Philadelphia Athletics at Columbia Park in Philadelphia. Cy Young was the winning pitcher.
 May 2: In their highest-scoring game of the year, Boston defeats Philadelphia, 23–12 in a road victory.
 May 8: The team plays and wins its first-ever home game, 12–4 over the visiting Athletics.
 May 11: Buck Freeman receives the first ejection in franchise history, sent off by umpire Jack Haskell following a call at second base, in a home loss to the Washington Senators.
 May 17: The team's longest losing streak of the season, five games between May 11 and 16, comes to an end with a victory over the visiting Orioles.
 June 10: A 7–4 win over the visiting Milwaukee Brewers gives the team a winning record for the first time, as they reach 17–16. In 1902, the Brewers moved and became the St. Louis Browns, then in 1954 moved again and became today's Baltimore Orioles.
 June 24: The team's longest winning streak of the season, nine games between June 14 and 22, comes to an end with a loss to the visiting Cleveland Blues.
 August 27: The team's longest game of the season ends as a 2–1 win in 15 innings over the visiting Detroit Tigers.
 September 28: The season ends with a home doubleheader against the Brewers; Boston wins both games, 8–3, and 10–9 in seven innings.

Statistical leaders
The offense was led by Buck Freeman, who hit 12 home runs and had 114 RBIs while recording a .339 batting average. The pitching staff was led by Cy Young, who made 43 appearances (41 starts) and pitched 38 complete games with a 33–10 record and 1.62 ERA, while striking out 158 in  innings.

Season standings 

The team had two games end in a tie; August 31 at Detroit Tigers and September 12 at Washington Senators. Tied games are not counted in league standings, but player statistics during tied games are counted.

Record vs. opponents

Opening Day lineup 

Source:

Roster

Player stats

Batting

Starters by position 
Note: Pos = Position; G = Games played; AB = At bats; H = Hits; Avg. = Batting average; HR = Home runs; RBI = Runs batted in

Other batters 
Note: G = Games played; AB = At bats; H = Hits; Avg. = Batting average; HR = Home runs; RBI = Runs batted in

Pitching

Starting pitchers 
Note: G = Games pitched; IP = Innings pitched; W = Wins; L = Losses; ERA = Earned run average; SO = Strikeouts

Other pitchers 
Note: G = Games pitched; IP = Innings pitched; W = Wins; L = Losses; ERA = Earned run average; SO = Strikeouts

Relief pitchers
Note: G = Games pitched; W = Wins; L = Losses; SV = Saves; ERA = Earned run average; SO = Strikeouts

References

External links 
1901 Boston Americans team page at Baseball Reference
1901 Boston Americans season at baseball-almanac.com

Boston Red Sox seasons
Boston Americans
Boston Americans
1900s in Boston